Endoufielle is a French commune located in the Gers department of Occitanie in southwestern France. Historically and culturally, the town is in the Savès, a small Gascon province corresponding to the middle course of the Save.

Exposed to an altered oceanic climate, it is drained by the Save, the Boulouze, the Laurio stream, the Peyblanc stream and by various other small streams.

Endoufielle is a rural town with 505 inhabitants in 2020, after having experienced a sharp increase in population since 1975. It is part of the Toulouse area of attraction. Its inhabitants are called Endoufiellois or Endoufielloises.

Geography

Population

See also
Communes of the Gers department

References

Communes of Gers